The following is a list of Madlib releases under that name or  Yesterdays New Quintet, a fictional jazz group created by Madlib.

Madlib began his career with Lootpack, a hip hop group.  Later in his career he was a member of Jaylib and Madvillain.  Quasimoto is a fictional rapper created by pitching up Madlib's own voice. Under that name he released three albums, in 2000, 2005 and 2013. Madlib also released a house/techno album under the name DJ Rels titled Theme for a Broken Soul. Other notable collaborations include Dudley Perkins, with whom he has produced 3 entire albums. Madlib has released 3 multiple-volume album series: Beat Konducta (Vol. 0-6), Mind Fusion (Vol. 1-5) and Madlib Medicine Show (Vol. 1-13)

As Madlib

Albums

Studio albums

Collaborative albums

Extended plays

Series

Singles

As Yesterdays New Quintet

Albums

EPs

References

Production discographies
Hip hop discographies
Discography
Discographies of American artists